Kuntur Wasi (Quechua kuntur condor, wasi house, "condor house") is the name given to the ruins of a religious center with complex architecture and stone sculptures, located in the Andean highlands of Peru. It is believed the inhabitants had a link with the Chavín culture.

Kuntur Wasi is located in the Northern Mountain Range of Peru, specifically at the headwaters of the Jequetepeque River, in the region of the city of Cajamarca near the small town of San Pablo. The Jequetepeque valley provided a transportation corridor between the coastal region and the highlands. Kuntur Wasi was a center where people congregated.

It is thought to have been constructed around 1000-700 BCE, during the Initial Period. The architecture consists of a hill-top temple, quadrangular platforms, a sunken courtyard, and series of rooms.

In the floor of one room there is an anthropomorphic figure made of clay, about 30 inches (75 cm) in height. It is painted with cinnabar red, malachite green, and black, yellow, and pink. Its face has big square eyes and a wide mouth with prominent canine teeth.

There are also stepped platforms and funeral structures.

Lithosculptures have been found, carved with serpent and feline designs that are similar to the Chavín style. Those to be found at the site are reproductions, with the originals having been moved to museums.

The area of Kuntur Wasi was occupied between the years 1200-50 BC.

It was first discovered in 1945 by Julio C. Tello. In 1989, scientists from the University of Tokyo excavated four tombs at Kuntur Wasi. Valuable items, such as pectoral necklaces (decorative breastplates), gold crowns, ornamental stone beads, earrings, sets of dishes and iconographies of people were discovered in the burial area. Since the beginning of the University of Tokyo's archaeological mission, eight tombs have been found in the area.

The Kuntur Wasi Museum, managed by local citizens, opened in 1994.

Gallery

See also
Cultural periods of Peru
Cupisnique
Kotosh
Corantijn Basin, Suriname
Archaeological sites in Peru

References

External links 

 Official Website (English, Spanish, Japanese)

Archaeological sites in Peru
Archaeological sites in Cajamarca Region
Chavin culture
Cupisnique culture
Tourist attractions in Cajamarca Region